Lees railway station opened on 5 July 1856 at Lees, Lancashire, when the London and North Western Railway (L&NWR) opened the branch from  to .

The station was located to the south-east of St. John Street, where it crossed the railway. There were two running lines with platforms on the outer sides connected by a footbridge. The main building was to the south of the line and was accessed by a ramp running down from the road over-bridge. To the south east of the station was a goods yard with a goods shed and between the station and the goods shed was a coal depôt. The goods yard was able to accommodate most types of goods including live stock and was equipped with a ten ton crane.

Services

By 1866 the station saw fourteen services in each direction (four on Sundays) of which three continued to Delph (none on Sundays). By 1922 the number of services had increased to about thirty-nine each way (there was some variation on Saturdays) of which eighteen continued to Delph (none on Sundays). In 1939 the LMS service was about the same with around thirty-eight services each way, with even more variation on Saturdays, twenty-one of which continued to Delph (except on Sundays).

The station closed to passengers on 2 May 1955, when the Delph Donkey passenger train service to Delph via Greenfield was withdrawn. The station closed to goods traffic on 16 December 1963. The line remained open until 13 April 1964.

Not far from the station, to the north east, was Lees Engine Shed which was open from 1878 to April 1964.

Currently the line is a cyclepath and there is no evidence of the station remaining.



References

Citations

Bibliography

Further reading

 

Disused railway stations in the Metropolitan Borough of Oldham
Former London and North Western Railway stations
Railway stations in Great Britain opened in 1856
Railway stations in Great Britain closed in 1955